Lebo is a city in Coffey County, Kansas, United States.  As of the 2020 census, the population of the city was 885.

History
Lebo was founded in 1883. It was named for Capt. Joe Lebo, a pioneer settler.

The first post office in Lebo was established on June 4, 1883.

Geography
Lebo is located at  (38.415517, -95.858633).

Climate
The climate in this area is characterized by hot, humid summers and generally mild to cool winters.  According to the Köppen Climate Classification system, Lebo has a humid subtropical climate, abbreviated "Cfa" on climate maps.

Area attractions
Attractions of interest to travelers include Lebo Lake, John Redmond Reservoir, Melvern Reservoir, Coffey County Lake, Beto Junction, historic Arvonia town and the Coffey County Museum.

Demographics

2010 census
As of the census of 2010, there were 940 people, 371 households, and 272 families living in the city. The racial makeup of the city was 98.9% White, 0.3% African American, 0.2% Native American, 0.1% from other races, and 0.4% from two or more races. Hispanic or Latino of any race were 1.4% of the population.

There were 371 households, of which 35.3% had children under the age of 18 living with them, 59.0% were married couples living together, 9.4% had a female householder with no husband present, 4.9% had a male householder with no wife present, and 26.7% were non-families. 22.4% of all households were made up of individuals, and 9.1% had someone living alone who was 65 years of age or older. The average household size was 2.53 and the average family size was 2.94.

The median age in the city was 40.4 years. 26.1% of residents were under the age of 18; 8.2% were between the ages of 18 and 24; 22.9% were from 25 to 44; 26% were from 45 to 64; and 16.8% were 65 years of age or older. The gender makeup of the city was 52.1% male and 47.9% female.

2000 census
As of the census of 2000, there were 961 people, 371 households, and 271 families living in the city. The racial makeup of the city was 96.88% White, 0.42% Native American, 1.56% from other races, and 1.14% from two or more races. Hispanic or Latino of any race were 2.81% of the population.

There were 371 households, out of which 35.8% had children under the age of 18 living with them, 60.6% were married couples living together, 7.8% had a female householder with no husband present, and 26.7% were non-families. 23.2% of all households were made up of individuals, and 12.1% had someone living alone who was 65 years of age or older. The average household size was 2.59 and the average family size was 3.04.

In the city, the population was spread out, with 28.6% under the age of 18, 6.6% from 18 to 24, 27.2% from 25 to 44, 22.7% from 45 to 64, and 15.0% who were 65 years of age or older. The median age was 36 years. For every 100 females, there were 99.8 males. For every 100 females age 18 and over, there were 90.0 males.

The median income for a household in the city was $39,297, and the median income for a family was $45,089. Males had a median income of $31,058 versus $19,821 for females. The per capita income for the city was $16,532. About 4.6% of families and 5.2% of the population were below the poverty line, including 1.8% of those under age 18 and 10.7% of those age 65 or over.

Education
The community is served by Lebo–Waverly USD 243 public school district, and has two schools in the city: Lebo High School and Lebo Grade School.

See also
 Melvern Lake

References

Further reading

External links
 City of Lebo
 Lebo - Directory of Public Officials
 Lebo city map, KDOT

Cities in Kansas
Cities in Coffey County, Kansas